State Route 132 (SR 132) is part of Maine's system of numbered state highways, located in Androscoggin and Kennebec counties. The route runs from SR 9 and SR 126 in Sabattus to US 202, SR 11, and SR 100 in northern Monmouth.

Route description
SR 132 begins at the intersection with SR 9 and SR 126 in Sabattus. The route heads north towards Wales. After passing Wales, the road continues heading north towards the southern terminus of SR 135 at Monmouth. SR 132 continues heading north towards its northern terminus at US 202, SR 11, and SR 100 in northern Monmouth.

Junction list

References

External links

Floodgap Roadgap's RoadsAroundME: Maine State Route 132

132
Transportation in Androscoggin County, Maine
Transportation in Kennebec County, Maine